Michigan's 38th Senate district is one of 38 districts in the Michigan Senate. The 38th district was created with the adoption of the 1963 Michigan Constitution, as the previous 1908 state constitution only permitted 34 senatorial districts. It has been represented by Republican Ed McBroom since 2019, succeeding fellow Republican Tom Casperson.

Geography
District 38 encompasses the entirety of Alger, Baraga, Delta, Dickinson, Gogebic, Houghton, Iron, Keweenaw, Luce, Marquette, Menominee, Ontonagon, and Schoolcraft counties, as well as parts of Chippewa and Mackinac counties.

2011 Apportionment Plan
District 38, as dictated by the 2011 Apportionment Plan, was based in the western two-thirds of the Upper Peninsula, covering all of Alger, Baraga, Delta, Dickinson, Gogebic, Hougton, Iron, Keweenaw, Marquette, Menominee, Ontonagon, and Schoolcraft Counties. Communities in the district included Baraga, Escanaba, Gladstone, 
Hancock, Houghton, Iron Mountain, 
Iron River, Ironwood, Ishpeming, Kingsford, Manistique, Marquette, Menominee, Munising, Negaunee, Norway, and Ontonagon.

The district was located entirely within Michigan's 1st congressional district, and overlapped with the 108th, 109th, and 110th districts of the Michigan House of Representatives. It bordered the state of Wisconsin, as well as Lake Michigan, Lake Superior, and Canada via a water border.

List of senators

Recent election results

2018

2014

Federal and statewide results in District 38

Historical district boundaries

References 

37
Alger County, Michigan
Baraga County, Michigan
Delta County, Michigan
Dickinson County, Michigan
Gogebic County, Michigan
Houghton County, Michigan
Iron County, Michigan
Keweenaw County, Michigan
Marquette County, Michigan
Menominee County, Michigan
Ontonagon County, Michigan
Schoolcraft County, Michigan